Telecommunications networks in Uzbekistan are largely based on Soviet-built infrastructure but with many modern additions, making the country one of the leading influences in the region in informational development.

In 2012, the telecommunications services volume grew by 22.5% year-on-year in Uzbekistan. The number of broadband ports installed totalled 378,000 across the country at the end of 2012, up by 55.5% year-on-year. The number of ports in active use was 202,700 up by 37.2%. A total of 1,576 km of fibre optic backbone lines were deployed across the country in the same year.

Telephone 
There are digital exchanges in large cities and rural areas.

Domestic system 
The main line telecommunications system is dilapidated and telephone density is low. The state-owned telecommunications company, Uztelecom, has used loans from the Japanese government and the China Development Bank to improve mainline services. The completion of conversion to digital exchanges was in 2010. Mobile services are growing rapidly, with the subscriber base reaching 25 million in 2011.

International system 
Uzbekistan is linked by fiber-optic cable or microwave radio relay with CIS member states and to other countries by leased connection via the Moscow international gateway switch. After the completion of the Uzbek link to the Trans-Asia-Europe (TAE) fiber-optic cable, Uzbekistan plans to establish a fiber-optic connection to Afghanistan.

Radio 
Currently, Uzbekistan has four AM stations, 12 FM stations, and three shortwave stations. Additionally, as of 1997, there are an estimated 10.2 million radios in use in Uzbekistan.

Television 
Uzbekistan has 28 television broadcast stations. This includes one cable rebroadcaster in Tashkent and approximately 20 stations in regional capitals.

Internet 
Internet access in Uzbekistan has significantly developed after its new president, Shavkat Mirziyoyev, came to power.  Compared to the past, you can now access Instagram, Facebook, Twitter and many other social networks without any restrictions. The new president has opened up the country to FDIs and has signed a tax incentive for business opportunities to improve the private business sector. He has also addressed and put a lot of effort into improving internet connections and mobility within the country.

Buying or renting sim cards and mobile wifi routers was almost impossible for tourists who visit Uzbekistan. Currently, tourists can easily buy prepaid sim cards from any mobile operators with no trouble. In addition to that renting wifi routers and buying prepaid SIM cards is also possible in most of the railway stations and airports, since  Private Prepaid SIM cards and Mobile Wifi router rental companies started their businesses after the tourism industry started developing significantly.

References 

 

 
Uzbekistan
Uzbekistan